Cyperus leucocephalus is a species of sedge that is native to parts of Asia.

See also 
 List of Cyperus species

References 

leucocephalus
Plants described in 1788
Taxa named by Anders Jahan Retzius
Flora of India
Flora of Cambodia
Flora of Bangladesh
Flora of Myanmar
Flora of Thailand
Flora of Vietnam